Welcome to Germany is a 2016 German comedy film written and directed by Simon Verhoeven.

The film grossed more than US$20 million in Germany.

Plot 
The Hartmanns are the former teacher Angelika; her husband Richard, a chief physician; their daughter Sofie, 31, now a psychology student; her brother Philipp, a successful business lawyer who's living in divorce and his 12-year-old son Basti. Richard has problems with aging; He refuses to retire, and undergoes face-lifting with his friend, the cosmetic surgeon Dr. Sascha Heinrich. Angelika is criticized by her husband for her starry-eyed idealism.
In a container accommodation for refugees Angelika one day donates used clothes and meets her former colleague Heike Broscher, who gives German courses. Since there are no more staff needed in the accommodation, Angelika decides to adopt a refugee. She discusses it with her family during a meal. Richard and Philipp initially refuse it categorically while Angelika is receiving support from Sofie. Angelika already has an appointment with Bernd Bader, the head of the accommodation. So Richard goes with them and they finally decide on the stand-alone Nigerian Diallo, after previously being presented to several families.
Richard is annoyed at work; He repeatedly snubs the ambitious and handsome young doctor Tarek Berger, which one day leads to an indicatory dispute within earshot of other employees. Richard grabs his heart with a distorted face after each of his tantrums. Tarek, in turn, runs a weekly jogging group of refugees, in which Diallo also participates. Richard and Tarek know each other from a birthday party Sofie, when the nine-year-old Tarek destroyed a valuable vase. Diallo, who does handicraft activities in the garden and in the house, has a very good relationship with Angelika. He can not understand many things about the Germans. For example, that Sofie has neither a husband nor children. When Basti shoots a hip-hop video with his friends at school, Diallo acts as a full-time supervisor. The shooting of the video almost gets Basti expelled, but Philipp is able to prevent that. Since Basti also has bad grades, Philipp suggests to the teacher that Basti could accomplish his transfer with a good presentation. Otherwise, Philipp has no time for his son, as he has to constantly fly to Shanghai, where he leads an important project. Once again rushing to his flight, he defies control at the airport and ends up in psychiatry. There, a burnout syndrome is diagnosed. Basti gives a presentation on refugee issues at school, including Diallo, who tells how his village was destroyed by Boko Haram and how he lost his family.

In the meantime, the exalted Heike has organized a salutation for Diallo in the Villa of Hartmanns, for which she has invited members of an Africa group and a circus; a zebra is also present. The neighbor brings the police because of noise disturbance, who also noticed that the somewhat out of joint party for the asylum seeker Diallo was held. Sophie is followed by her devotee Kurt, who sees an Islamist in Diallo and with a few friends in front of the House of Hartmanns organized a "picket" with torches and "security" calls. There is a fight between the two. Sofie has Kurt taken away by the police, who was called by the neighbor, as an intruder.
Diallo wants to bring together the two singles Sofie and Tarek, but they tell him that they want to find a partner themselves, as is customary in Germany. The two eventually meet by chance and fall in love with each other. In a discotheque they come across Richard, who "wants to enjoy life" and is introduced to women by Sascha. Richard has since moved out after differences with Angelika at home. Diallo meets him on a bank by the river and tells him to go home to Angelika, who belongs to him. Richard corrects him that at the most she belongs with him. Diallo's asylum application is rejected. Bernd Bader appeals for him, so that it comes to a court hearing. Basti pleads with his father on the phone in Shanghai to come and defend Diallo. Philipp refuses this initially, but then leaves his assistant to lead the contract negotiations and comes straight to court when the judge wants to read the verdict.

With his rhetoric, he still fights for Diallo and proposes to watch the video of Basti's presentation on the smartphone. But this had already happened, as Basti had this idea, and the judge wanted to announce Diallos asylum recognition anyway.
When Richard returns to Angelika, while Tarek introduces himself to her, outside there is a demonstration of right-wing extremists again. Meanwhile, Richard suffers a heart attack and Tarek provides First Aid. Diallo is now being monitored by anti-terrorist personnel using a drone camera. They misjudge the situation and send a task force to storm the house. When the commanders see that Diallo is helpful and not threatening, the action is canceled.
Diallo's verdict finally turns out to be positive and he is celebrating a party with the Hartmanns, Heike and Tarek.

Cast 
 Senta Berger as Angelika Hartmann
 Heiner Lauterbach as Dr. Richard Hartmann
 Florian David Fitz as Philipp Hartmann
 Palina Rojinski as Sofie Hartmann
 Eric Kabongo as Diallo Makabouri
 Elyas M'Barek as Dr. Tarek Berger
 Uwe Ochsenknecht as Dr. Sascha Heinrich
 Ulrike Kriener as Heike Broscher
 Eisi Gulp as Bernd Bader
 Marinus Hohmann as Basti
 Thilo Prothmann as Kurt Blümlein
 Esther Kuhn as Clarissa
 Ulla Geiger as Nachbarin
 Wolfgang Maria Bauer as Schickdorf

Awards 

 Lola German Film Awards - (2016) Most Successful Film for Welcome to Germany
 Bavarian Film Awards - (2016) Best Film + Audience Award for Welcome to Germany
 Bogey Awards - (2016) for 1 million tickets sold within 10 days of release for Welcome to Germany
 Goldene Leinwand - (2016) for over 3 million tickets sold within 18 months of release for Welcome to Germany
 AZ Stern des Jahres - (2016) for Welcome to Germany
 Peace Prize of German Film "The Bridge" (Friedenspreis des Deutschen Films "Die Brücke") - (2017) for Welcome to Germany
 Bambi - (2017) Best German Film for Welcome to Germany
 GQ Men of the Year Awards - (2017) Special Achievement Award for Welcome to Germany
 Jupiter Award - (2017) Best German Film for Welcome to Germany
 European Film Award - (2017) Best Comedy (nominated) for Welcome to Germany
 German Comedy Awards - (2017) Best Film Comedy for Welcome to Germany
 Günther Rohrbach Preis - (2017) Best Screenplay for Welcome to Germany
 European Union Film Festival Toronto- (2018) Audience Award

References

External links 

2016 films
Films about refugees
German comedy films
2016 comedy films
2010s German-language films
Films about immigration to Germany
2010s German films